The Blue Mosque is an 18th-century Persian Shia mosque in Yerevan, Armenia. It was commissioned by Huseyn Ali Khan, the khan of the Iranian Erivan Khanate. It is one of the oldest extant structures in central Yerevan and the most significant structure from the city's Iranian period. It was the largest of the eight mosques of Yerevan in the 19th century and is today the only active mosque in Armenia.

The mosque was secularized in the 1920s and housed the History Museum of Yerevan for more than five decades. Following Armenia's independence, the mosque was renovated with the support from the Iranian government and again started operating as a mosque, serving the Muslims residing in Armenia.

Names
Western visitors in the Russian period, such as H. F. B. Lynch and Luigi Villari, referred to the mosque as Gök Jami (Gok Djami), which translates from Turkish as "sky blue mosque". It is known as Կապույտ մզկիթ, Kapuyt mzkit’ "Blue Mosque" in Armenian, although Գյոյ մզկիթ, Gyoy mzkit՛ is sometimes used as well. It is known in Persian as Masjid-i Juma or Jami-i Shahr.

History

Early history
The mosque was built in 1765–1766 (AH 1179) by Hussein (Hoseyn) Ali Khan, the ruler of the Erivan Khanate under the Afsharid dynasty of Persia, as the city's main Friday mosque. The mosque underwent substantial redecoration with tiles around 1887-88 (AH 1305), under Russian administration. The mosque underwent another reconstruction in 1907–1910.

The mosque was the largest of the eight mosques operating in Yerevan when the Russians captured it in 1827.

H. F. B. Lynch, who visited Erivan in 1890s, wrote: "There is nothing very remarkable in the architecture of the mosque; but the floral paintings which adorn the ceiling of a companion and smaller edifice on the north side of the court are of very high merit." Luigi Villari, an Italian diplomat and historian, gave a detailed description of the mosque in his 1906 book titled Fire and Sword in the Caucasus. He wrote that the "great mosque called the Gok Djami [...] is a good deal more than a mosque; it is a long quadrangle containing several places of worship and a number of cells, schools, and offices of the Moslem religious administration. It is not very ancient [...] but it is handsome." The Encyclopædia Britannica (1911) described the mosque as the "finest building in the city."

Soviet period
The mosque was secularized after Soviet rule was established in Armenia. The mosque's entrances and exits were modified significantly. The main gate, on the southern side, to the right of the minaret was blocked. The western gate was "incorporated into a residence complex and became hardly recognizable as an entrance." The entrance on the northern side became the only entrance. It is accessible and visible from Mashtots Avenue. Beginning with Alexander Tamanian's 1924 master plan for Yerevan, the mosque has been situated more than two meters below the street level, which requires visitors to descend a flight of steps.

The mosque ceased to operate as a religious institution in the mid-1920s. Its courtyard became a "creative space for Armenian artists, writers, poets, and intelligentsia, facilitating the production of a new cultural and aesthetic order for socialist Armenia. The courtyard was protected by large elm and plane trees, and in this way provided the hot and dusty city with a shaded refuge." The courtyard housed a teahouse, which became a hub for intellectual gatherings. Yeghishe Charents, Martiros Saryan, Aksel Bakunts were among its regular visitors. Foreign guests included Armenian-American writer William Saroyan, Russian Jewish poet Osip Mandelstam, Russian novelist Andrei Bely and others. Local artists used the "courtyard for exhibitions and as a laboratory for new socialist spirituality." Seyed Hossein Tabatabai, Adviser of the Cultural Center of the Iranian Embassy in Armenia, noted that the mosque was "preserved by the efforts of a number of Armenian intellectuals," especially Charents.

In the 1930s first the Anti-Religious Museum and subsequently the Museum of Antifascism were housed at the mosque. From 1936 until the collapse of the Soviet Union, the mosque housed the Museum of Natural Sciences, which included a planetarium inside the main prayer hall and the Yerevan History Museum.

Independence period
In the late 1980s, during the Nagorno-Karabakh conflict, the mosque did not sustain any damages because it was considered to be Persian, not Azerbaijani, and housed the city's history museum.

In February 1991 a preliminary agreement was reached between the city's authorities and an Iranian delegation to restore the mosque. The mosque underwent major renovation between 1994 and 1998. The city's authorities officially transferred the right to use the mosque to Iran on October 13, 1995. The government of Iran allocated some 1 billion Iranian rials (over $1 million) for restoration works. The mosque was re-opened as a religious institution in 1996. Brady Kiesling described the restoration as "structurally necessary but aesthetically ambiguous."

Another reconstruction was done between 2009 and 2011.

Today
The Blue Mosque is the only active mosque in Armenia, which has a small Muslim population (between 812 and 1,000 or 0.03% of the total population).

Since restoration, it has become a religious and cultural center for the Iranians residing in Armenia and Iranian tourists visiting Armenia. In 2003 the journalist Thomas de Waal noted that the only regular worshippers at the mosque were "the dozen or so diplomats from the Iranian Embassy." Less than a decade later, in 2009, ArmeniaNow wrote that of the up to 2,000 Iranians residing in Yerevan as many as 500 periodically attend the mosque on Thursdays. The Iranian cultural center inside the mosque complex attracts young Armenians seeking to learn Persian. The Persian library of over 8,000 items, named after the poet Hafez, was opened inside the complex in October 2014.

On December 10, 2015 the government of Armenia leased the mosque complex to the embassy of Iran to Armenia for 99 years to use it as a cultural center.

Architecture
The mosque is listed by the Armenian government as a monument of national significance. It is "one of the oldest buildings in central Yerevan" and the "only extant building of the Iranian period in Yerevan." The historian of Islamic art Markus Ritter described it as the "main model for the early Qajar mosque architecture of the Iranian period." The mosque contains the traditional Shia attributes, including a minaret, three mihrabs (prayer halls), holy inscriptions, etc. The mosque includes 24 arched cells that face the pool in the middle of the courtyard, which is surrounded by a rose garden.

Efforts to list as a World Heritage Site

In October 2007 Armenian Foreign Affairs Minister Vartan Oskanian stated during his speech at the 34th session of the UNESCO General Conference in Paris that the Blue Mosque and other sites are on the waiting list for inclusion in the UNESCO World Heritage List. In January 2013 Armenian Minister of Culture Hasmik Poghosyan stated that Armenia will take all possible steps for inclusion of the mosque in the list. She reaffirmed this position in a meeting with Iranian Culture Minister Mohammad Hosseini in April 2013. Hosseini stated that he hoped Armenian efforts would succeed. Armenia's Foreign Affairs Minister Eduard Nalbandyan, in his speech at the 38th session of UNESCO General Conference in November 2015:

On October 15, 2015 Armenian Prime Minister Hovik Abrahamyan and First Vice President of Iran Eshaq Jahangiri attended an event dedicated to the 250th anniversary of the mosque. Abrahamyan stated in his speech that both Armenia and Iran "are now making efforts to have it put on the UNESCO World Heritage list."

Controversy
Multiple Western and Armenian sources describe the mosque as Iranian/Persian. The anthropologist and ethnographer Tsypylma Darieva notes that "in local media and in official discourses, the Blue Mosque has been strongly associated with the new expatriate political body symbolizing the recent Armenian–Iranian friendship. This dominant reading of the place defines the Blue Mosque exclusively as the ‘Persian Mosque’." Darieva notes that it served as a Friday mosque for the Muslim population in Yerevan until the mid 1920s.

In Azerbaijan, the mosque is usually referred to as a monument of Azerbaijani heritage of Yerevan. One government official called it "the largest religious center of Azerbaijanis living in Yerevan." A 2007 book titled War against Azerbaijan: Targeting Cultural Heritage, published by the Ministry of Foreign Affairs of Azerbaijan and the Heydar Aliyev Foundation, objected to the restoration of the mosque in the 1990s and to its "presentation as a Persian mosque." The independent Armenian scholar Rouben Galichian argues in his 2009 book Invention of History:

At a 2022 forum, Armenian prime minister Nikol Pashinyan stated: "We have great respect for Islamic civilization and religion, and one of the clearest proofs of this is the Blue Mosque in the center of Yerevan, which, by the way, was restored during the period of Armenia’s independence." At the 2023 Munich Security Conference, Pashinyan, in response to Ilham Aliyev's accusation that Armenia destroyed mosques in Nagorno-Karabakh, stated that Armenia has a "Muslim minority in our country, and we have a functioning mosque."

Visit of Azerbaijani MPs
In February 2022 two Azerbaijani pro-government MPs, Tahir Mirkişili and Soltan Məmmədov, attending a Euronest Parliamentary Assembly meeting in Yerevan, visited the mosque. Mirkişili wrote that "Although there are inscriptions related to another state on its walls, its architecture, walls, and spirit as a whole are affiliated with Azerbaijan. We believe that its true owners will soon be able to offer their prayers in the mosque." The Iranian embassy in Armenia responded by calling the mosque a "symbol of Iranian art" and noting that "centuries-old Persian epigraphy has been preserved" on its walls. Mahmoud Movahedifar, an Iranian clergyman serving at the mosque, stated that it has distinctive features of Iran's traditional Islamic architecture and that all inscriptions are in Persian. Movahedifar added, "Even if there was a single tile here with an Azerbaijani inscription we would recognize that fact."

See also 
 Islam in Armenia
 Iranian Armenia (1502-1828)
 Abbas Mirza Mosque, Yerevan

References
Notes

Citations

Bibliography

 
 
 
 
 

Religious buildings and structures completed in 1766
Shia mosques in Armenia
Buildings and structures in Yerevan
Tourist attractions in Yerevan
18th-century mosques
Persian-Caucasian architecture
Armenia–Iran relations
Closed mosques in the Soviet Union
1760s establishments in Iran